Stanislav Rudolf (16 February 1932 – 8 January 2022) was a Czech writer, screenwriter and journalist.

Life and career 
Born in Jičín, Rudolf graduated in Educational Sciences at the University of South Bohemia in České Budějovice, working as a primary school teacher in Písek. In the second half of the 1950s he studied Czech and pedagogy at the Charles University in Prague, and became a university assistant of Czech literature at the Brandýs nad Labem department of the Charles University.

His novels were often set in school environments and had female teenage characters as main protagonists. Several of his books including his debut novel were adapted into films, and Rudolf himself worked as a screenwriter in films and television. 

Rudolf died in Brandýs nad Labem-Stará Boleslav on 8 January 2022, at the age of 89.

References

External links
 

1932 births
2022 deaths
Czech writers
Czech children's writers
Czech screenwriters
Male screenwriters
Czech educational theorists
People from Jičín
Academic staff of Charles University